Doctor on Toast is a 1961 comedy novel by the British writer Richard Gordon. Part of his long-running Doctor series, it features Doctor Grimsdyke and his superior Sir Lancelot Spratt in a series of amusing situations.

Adaptation
The novel provided a loose inspiration for the 1970 film Doctor in Trouble starring Leslie Phillips and Robert Morley.

References

Bibliography
 Goble, Alan. The Complete Index to Literary Sources in Film. Walter de Gruyter, 1999.

1961 British novels
Novels by Richard Gordon
Comedy novels
British novels adapted into films
Novels set in hospitals
Michael Joseph books